Stanley Falls may refer to :

 Stanley Falls, Congo, former name for the Boyoma Falls, seven Congolese cataracts on the Lualaba River
 Stanley Falls District, the eastern part of the Congo Free State, later the Belgian Congo
 Two successive former Roman Catholic missionary jurisdictions in the Congo:
 Apostolic Prefecture of Stanley Falls, which eventually became the Archdiocese of Kinshasa  
 Apostolic Vicariate of Stanley Falls, which became the Metropolitan Roman Catholic Archdiocese of Kisangani